Martina Hingis and Leander Paes defeated defending champions Kristina Mladenovic and Daniel Nestor in the final, 6–4, 6–3, to win the mixed doubles tennis title at the 2015 Australian Open. The victory earned both Hingis and Paes their second Grand Slam mixed doubles title and their first title together as a new pairing. This was also Hingis's first Grand Slam title since making her comeback from retirement in 2013.

Seeds

Draw

Finals

Top half

Bottom half

References

 Main Draw

External links
 2015 Australian Open – Doubles draws and results at the International Tennis Federation

Mixed Doubles
Australian Open (tennis) by year – Mixed doubles